The first season of the television series The Wire commenced airing on Sunday, June 2, 2002, at 9:00 pm ET in the United States and concluded on September 8, 2002. The 13 episodes tell the story from the points of view of both the drug-dealing Barksdale organization and the investigating police detail.

The season was released on DVD as a five-disc boxed set under the title of The Wire: The Complete First Season on October 12, 2004, by HBO Video.

Production

Crew
David Simon is the series' creator and head writer, showrunner and executive producer. Alongside Simon, many of the creative team behind The Wire are alumni of Homicide and Emmy-winning miniseries The Corner. The Corner veteran, Robert F. Colesberry, was also executive producer. Colesberry is credited by the rest of the creative team as having a large creative role for a producer, and Simon credits him for achieving the show's realistic visual feel. He also had a small recurring role as Detective Ray Cole. Colesberry's wife Karen L. Thorson joined him on the production staff. A third producer on The Corner, Nina Kostroff Noble, also stayed with the production staff for The Wire rounding out the initial four-person team.

Stories for the show are often co-written by Ed Burns, a former Baltimore Police Department homicide detective and public school teacher who has worked with Simon on other projects including The Corner. The writing staff includes acclaimed crime fiction novelist George P. Pelecanos from Washington, D.C. Pelecanos has commented that he was attracted to the project because of the opportunity to work with Simon. Staff writer Rafael Alvarez was a colleague of Simon's from The Sun and a Baltimore native with working experience in the port area. Another city native and independent filmmaker, Joy Lusco Kecken, joined the writing staff and served as the script coordinator. David H. Melnick and Shamit Choksey complete the writing staff.

Homicide alumnus Clark Johnson, who directed several acclaimed episodes of The Shield, directed the pilot, the second episode, and the fifth episode (Johnson later had a starring role in the fifth season). Clement Virgo directed two episodes. Single episode directors include Ed Bianchi, Joe Chappelle, Gloria Muzio, Milčo Mančevski, Brad Anderson and Steve Shill. The season finale was directed by Tim Van Patten, an Emmy winner who has worked on every season of The Sopranos. The directing has been praised for its uncomplicated and subtle style.

Cast

The major characters of the first season were divided between those on the side of the law and those involved in drug-related crime. The starring cast comprised characters from both groups. The investigating detail was launched by the actions of Detective Jimmy McNulty (Dominic West), whose insubordinate tendencies and personal problems overshadowed his ability. The detail was led by Lieutenant Cedric Daniels (Lance Reddick), who faced challenges balancing his career aspirations with his desire to produce a good case. Kima Greggs (Sonja Sohn) was a capable lead detective who faced jealousy from colleagues and worry about the dangers of her job from her domestic partner. Her investigative work was helped by her confidential informant, a drug addict known as Bubbles (Andre Royo).

These investigators were overseen by two commanding officers more concerned with politics and their own careers than with the case, Major William Rawls (John Doman) and Deputy Commissioner Ervin Burrell (Frankie Faison). Assistant state's attorney Rhonda Pearlman (Deirdre Lovejoy) acted as the legal liaison between the detail and the courthouse and also had a casual relationship with McNulty. In the homicide division, Bunk Moreland (Wendell Pierce) was a gifted, dry-witted detective partnered with McNulty.

On the other side of the investigation was Avon Barksdale's drug empire. The driven, ruthless Barksdale (Wood Harris) was aided by business-minded Stringer Bell (Idris Elba). Avon's nephew D'Angelo Barksdale (Larry Gilliard Jr.) ran some of his uncle's territory, but also possessed a guilty conscience.

The first season featured several significant characters in recurring roles. Like Detective Greggs, partners Thomas "Herc" Hauk (Domenick Lombardozzi) and Ellis Carver (Seth Gilliam) were reassigned to the detail from the narcotics unit. The duo's initially violent nature was eventually subdued as they proved useful in grunt work, and sometimes served as comic relief for the audience. Rounding out the temporary unit were detectives Leander Sydnor (Corey Parker Robinson), Lester Freamon (Clarke Peters) and Roland "Prez" Pryzbylewski (Jim True-Frost). Sydnor was a rookie detective with a reputation for solid undercover work. Though not initially important players in the operation, Freamon proved a quietly capable investigator with a knack for noticing tiny but important details, and Prez, while a liability on the street, turned out to be a natural at his desk job. McNulty and Bunk served in a homicide unit squad led by Sergeant Jay Landsman (Delaney Williams), the jovial squad commander. Peter Gerety had a recurring role as Judge Phelan, the official who started the case moving.

There were also several recurring characters in the Barksdale Organization. Loyal Wee-Bey Brice (Hassan Johnson) was responsible for multiple homicides carried out on Avon's orders. Working under D'Angelo were Poot Carr (Tray Chaney), Bodie Broadus (J.D. Williams), and Wallace (Michael B. Jordan), all street-level drug dealers. Wallace was an intelligent but naïve youth trapped in the drug trade, Bodie a violent and determined young dealer, and Poot a lascivious young man happy to follow rather than lead. Omar Little (Michael K. Williams), a notorious Baltimore stick-up man robbing drug dealers for a living, was a frequent thorn in the side of the Barksdale clan.

Main cast
 Dominic West as Jimmy McNulty (13 episodes)
 John Doman as William Rawls (8 episodes)
 Idris Elba as Russell "Stringer" Bell (13 episodes)
 Frankie Faison as Ervin Burrell (11 episodes)
 Lawrence Gilliard Jr. as D'Angelo Barksdale (13 episodes)
 Wood Harris as Avon Barksdale (12 episodes)
 Deirdre Lovejoy as Rhonda Pearlman (9 episodes)
 Wendell Pierce as Bunk Moreland (12 episodes)
 Lance Reddick as Cedric Daniels (13 episodes)
 Andre Royo as Reginald "Bubbles" Cousins (11 episodes)
 Sonja Sohn as Kima Greggs (12 episodes)

Reception
The first season received mostly positive reviews from critics, holding a 79/100 on Metacritic. On Rotten Tomatoes, the season has an approval rating of 85% with an average score of 9.5 out of 10 based on 34 reviews. The website's critical consensus reads, "Though it takes its time getting started, The Wire is worth the wait, spinning a connective web of characters and delivering no-holds-barred commentary on some of America's unsettling societal problems."

Some called it superior to HBO's better-known "flagship" drama series such as The Sopranos and Six Feet Under. One reviewer felt that the show was partially a retread of themes from HBO and David Simon's earlier works but still valuable viewing, describing the series as particularly resonant because of parallels between the war on terror and the war on drugs. Another review postulated that the series might suffer because of its reliance on profanity and slowly drawn-out plot, but was largely positive about the show's characters and intrigue. TIME named the first season as the best TV show of 2002 in their Top 10 Everything 2002.

Despite the critical acclaim, The Wire has received poor Nielsen ratings, which Simon attributes to the complexity of the plot, a poor time slot, heavy use of esoteric slang (particularly among the gangster characters), and a predominantly black cast. Critics felt the show was testing the attention span of its audience and felt that it was mistimed in the wake of the launch of the successful crime drama The Shield on FX. However, anticipation for a release of the first season on DVD was high at Entertainment Weekly.

Awards and nominations
19th TCA Awards
Nomination for Program of the Year
Nomination for Outstanding Achievement in Drama
Nomination for Outstanding New Program of the Year

Episodes

References

External links 
 
 

2002 American television seasons
 1